Tommy Bahama Group Inc. is an American multinational manufacturer of casual men's and women's sportswear and activewear, denim, swimwear, accessories, footwear and a complete home furnishings collection. Its parent company is Oxford Industries. Tommy Bahama is available at Macy's, Dillard's, Neiman Marcus, Saks Fifth Avenue, Nordstrom, Lord & Taylor, Belk and Von Maur, along with resort locations around the world.  There are over 160 company-owned Tommy Bahama retail stores worldwide, 14 of which include a Tommy Bahama restaurant and bar.

History 
Tony Margolis, Bob Emfield, and their wives dreamed up the idea of "Tommy Bahama," a lifestyle of never leaving the beach. In 1991, Tony and Bob discussed their concept with Lucio Dalla Gasperina. From the outset, the three envisioned the kind of upscale casual apparel Tommy would wear: printed silk shirts and tailored pants for island living. Basing clothing on the concept, they founded Tommy Bahama Group, Inc. in 1993. In 2003, Tommy Bahama Group became fully owned by Oxford Industries, Inc.

Products

The men's sportswear line includes Tommy Bahama Collection, Tommy Bahama Relax, Tommy Bahama IslandActive, and Tommy Bahama Denim; Women's products include sportswear, denim, and swimwear. In addition to company manufactured offering of sportswear, they license home indoor and outdoor furnishings, eyewear, watches, umbrellas, luggage, hats, and men's and women's fragrances. The brand also licenses international companies to manufacture sportswear and operate Tommy Bahama's retail locations in Canada, Hong Kong, Macau, Singapore, Japan, United Arab Emirates and Australia.

Liquor range

Tommy Bahama launched its own brand of rum in 2007. The line includes two varieties, White Sand, a light rum; and Golden Sun, an aged, dark rum.  Both varieties are produced by R.L. Seale Distillery, which has been producing rum for more than 80 years in Barbados. 

Tommy Bahama Rum. was awarded the Double Gold for Tommy Bahama Golden Sun and Gold for Tommy Bahama White Sands at the 2010 San Francisco World Spirits Competition.  , liquor ratings aggregator Proof66.com placed the White Sand and Golden Sun rums in its "Tier 1" category, indicating the "Highest Recommendation."

Headquarters

The corporate headquarters of Tommy Bahama is located at 400 Fairview in the South Lake Union neighborhood of Seattle, Washington, and was built in 2015.

References

External links

Official website
Hoffman, Mike. "A Brand Is Born", Inc. Magazine, 1 December 2011.
 Ewoldt, John (19 August 2013). "Tommy Bahama menswear brand had its roots in Minnesota 20 years ago", Star Tribune (Minneapolis, Minnesota).

Clothing brands of the United States
Shoe companies of the United States
Watch brands
Companies based in Seattle
American companies established in 1993
Clothing companies established in 1993
Retail companies established in 1993